Eicon Networks Corporation is a privately owned designer, developer and manufacturer of communication products founded on October 12, 1984 with headquarters in Montreal, Quebec, Canada. Eicon products are sold worldwide  through a large network of distributors and resellers, and supplied to OEMs.

In October 2006, Eicon purchased the Media & Signalling Division of Intel, known as Dialogic before its purchase by Intel in 1999, which produces telephony boards for PC servers.  The combined Eicon/Dialogic company changed its name to Dialogic Corporation at the time of the purchase. It is meanwhile known as Dialogic Inc.

Products
Eicon's products include the Diva Family (Diva Server and Diva Client) and Eiconcard product lines.

Diva Server
Diva Server is a range of telecoms products for voice, speech, conferencing and fax. It supports T1/E1; SS7; ISDN and conventional phone line (PSTN). As of 2008 Eicon Host Media Processing products, "software adapters" that provide VoIP capability for applications, are available.

Diva Server is used in VoiceXML speech servers; SMS gateways; fax and unified messaging and call recording and monitoring.

Diva Client
Diva products are connectivity products for remote access for the home and for remote and mobile workers.  They are mostly ISDN or combined ISDN and dialup modems.  In the past Eicon produced ADSL and Wi-Fi equipment, but these areas have become dominated by far-eastern manufacturers.

Eiconcard
The Eiconcard connects legacy X.25 systems for tasks such as credit card authorization, SMS, and satellite communications.  The Eiconcard has been produced since the company was founded in 1984, and continues to be available.
Eicon cards with their flexible protocol stacks were also used as a flexible communications gateway to IBM's midrange and mainframe computers and for a time occupied a niche market allowing Ethernet based PC networks to utilise IBM's LU6.2 (intelligent) communications router without having to use Token Ring.

Graphics Products
Eicon has also produced graphics products alongside their core communications business.

Eiconscript
Eiconscript was a PostScript printing solution which used a laser 'print engine' connected to an intelligent adapter installed inside a PC. The adapter card ran an Eicon developed implementation of the PostScript language.

Eiconjet
Eiconjet was a laser printing solution using a design and hardware similar to Eiconscript. Rather than PostScript, it executed the Hewlett-Packard PCL5 (Printer Command Language). The Eiconjet software was also developed in-house as a Clean Room design.

See also
Dialogic Inc.
DOS Protected Mode Services for Eicon DIVA ISDN drivers

References

External links
Dialogic Communication Solutions

Telecommunications companies established in 1984
Telecommunications equipment vendors
VoIP companies
Manufacturing companies of Canada
Software companies of Canada
Networking hardware companies
Telecommunications companies of Canada
Companies based in Montreal
Privately held companies of Canada